Ramakrishna Mission Vidyapith may refer to:
Ramakrishna Mission Vidyapith, Purulia
Ramakrishna Mission Vidyapith, Deoghar
Ramakrishna Mission Vidyapith, Indore